Barak Ravid (Hebrew: ברק רביד, born 22 May 1980) is an Israeli journalist and commentator, who worked for Israel's Channel 13 News. He is also active in the English-language media, writing for Axios about Israeli politics.

Early life
Ravid was born in the Israeli city of Kfar Sava. At age 18 he was drafted to the Israeli military, serving in the intelligence division of Unit 8200. After being discharged, he earned a Bachelor of Arts in Middle Eastern history from Tel Aviv University.

Career
In 2007 he started working as a political pundit for the left-wing Israeli paper Haaretz. In 2017 he started working for Channel 13.

Barak Ravid also writes articles in English for Axios, an American news website. His articles typically center around Israeli politics and Israel-United States relations. He also frequently writes English commentaries about Israeli political affairs in his Twitter account.

Personal life
Ravid currently lives in Tel Aviv. He is married and has two children.

References 

1980 births
Living people
People from Kfar Saba
Tel Aviv University alumni
Political commentators
Israeli journalists